Patrice Coirault (26 September 1875 - 15 January 1959) was a French ethnomusicologist.

Early life
Patrice Coirault was born on 26 September 1875. His father was a schoolteacher and his mother was the daughter of farmers from Poitou.

Coirault was educated at the Lycée de Niort and the Lycée Michelet near Paris. He graduated from the University of Paris, where he earned a two-year degree.

Career
Coirault worked as a high-ranking civil servant in the Ministry of Public Works.

Coirault began researching traditional songs in the countrysides of Poitou and Béarn in 1898, under the mentorship of Charles Seignobos. By 1927, he authored his first book Recherches sur notre ancienne chanson populaire traditionnelle. He went on to publish several more books about French regional ethnomusicologist.

Death
Coirault died on 15 January 1959 in his hometown of Surin; he was 85.

Works

References

1875 births
1959 deaths
People from Deux-Sèvres
University of Paris alumni
French ethnomusicologists
French non-fiction writers